Denis Murphy (14 November 1910 – 7 April 1974) was an Irish fiddler and traditional musician.

Murphy was born in Lisheen, Gneeveguilla, County Kerry one of eight children of Bill and Mainie (née Corbett) Murphy.  His father played fife, flute and fiddle and had a fife and drum band.  It was a house where music was played a lot with neighbours calling in.  He and his sister Julia Clifford were taught fiddle by Pádraig O'Keeffe.  He later played with the Lisheen Fife and Drum Band.

Murphy emigrated to the United States, and in 1942 married Julie Mary Sheehan.  They returned often to Ireland and returned permanently to Lisheen in 1965.  While in the United States he played with the Ballinmore Ceili Band, with such players as Paddy Killoran, James Morrison, Andy McGann, Lad O'Beirne and Charlie Mulvihill.

Discography
Denis Murphy: Music from Sliabh Luachra, solo, RTÉ CD 183
The Star Above the Garter, with sister Julia Clifford, Claddagh Records CC5CD
Music from Sliabh Luachra Volume 1: Kerry Fiddles, with Pádraig O'Keeffe & Julia Clifford, Topic 12T 309 / TSCD309 and Ossian OSSCD10

External links
 Ronan Nolan's Biographical website
Comhaltas Biographical website

1910 births
1974 deaths
Irish emigrants to the United States
Irish fiddlers
Musicians from County Kerry
20th-century American violinists
20th-century American male musicians
Claddagh Records artists
People from Gneeveguilla